Svante Per Eric Mjörne (born 13 March 1958) is a Swedish former footballer who played as a midfielder, most notably for Djurgårdens IF.

Career

Early career 
Mjörne started his career with IFK Västerås before signing with Essinge IK in the early 1980s.

Djurgårdens IF 
Mjörne represented Djurgårdens IF between 1983 and 1987 and appeared in a total of 95 league games and scored 12 goals. His most notable performance came in 1985 when he helped Djurgården win promotion from Division 2 Norra to Allsvenskan. In the second leg of the 1985 Allsvenskan promotion play-off against GAIS, Mjörne assisted Teddy Sheringham's 1–1 equaliser in extra time which took the game into a penalty-kick shootout which Djurgården won.

During the 1986 Allsvenskan season, Mjörne made 12 league appearances and scored two goals as Djurgården finished last and was relegated to Division 1 Norra.

Spårvägens FF 
Mjörne finished his career with Spårvägens FF, signing for the club in 1989 and helping them win the 1989 Division 2 Norra league title.

Honours 
Djurgårdens IF

 Division 1 Norra: 1987
 Division 2 Norra: 1985

Spårvägens FF

 Division 2 Norra: 1989

References

Swedish footballers
Djurgårdens IF Fotboll players
Living people
Association football midfielders

1958 births
Spårvägens FF players
Essinge IK players
IFK Västerås players
Allsvenskan players